Association Sportive et Culturelle Emulation is a football club of Martinique, based in the town of Schœlcher.

They play in the Martinique's first division, the Martinique Championnat National, since they gained promotion at the end of the 2007/2008 season.

External links
 Club info – French Football Federation

Football clubs in Martinique